Pelagio is a masculine given name and a surname.

Notable people with the name include:

Given names
 Pelagio Antonio de Labastida y Dávalos (1816–1891), Mexican Roman Catholic prelate
 Pelagio Cruz (1912–1986), chief-of-staff of the Philippine Air Force
 Pelagio Galvani (c. 1165–1230), Spanish cardinal
 Pelagio Luna (1867–1919), Argentine politician
 Pelagio Palagi (1775–1860), Italian painter, sculptor and interior decorator
 Pelágio Sauter (1878–1961), German Roman Catholic priest

Surnames
 Pedro Pelágio (born 2000), Portuguese footballer

Music
 Pelagio (Mercadante), opera

See also
Pelagius (disambiguation)
Pelayo (disambiguation)

Masculine given names